Mabini, officially the Municipality of Mabini,  is a 4th class municipality in the province of Bohol, Philippines. According to the 2020 census, it has a population of 28,701 people.

The town of Mabini, Bohol celebrates its feast on May 4, to honor the town patron Santa Monica.

History
Established on July 23, 1904, through a resolution approved by then Governor General of the Philippines, the town of Mabini was initially composed of the three large barangays of Libas or Ubayon from Candijay, Batuanan (now Alicia), and Cabulao from Ubay. The efforts of establishing these barangays into a town came from Capitan Canuto Bernales, General Pedro Samsom and Atty. Gabino Sepulveda when the Philippines Governor General issued a directive to organize large barangays into towns.

Capitan Canuto Bernales, General Pedro Samsom and Atty. Gabino Sepulveda were friends and comrades-in-arms during the Filipino-Spanish and Filipino-American revolutions. The idea of naming the town as Mabini came from General Pedro Samson and Atty. Sepulveda, in honor of the hero, Apolinario Mabini, the Sublime Paralytic and Brain of the Revolution . Then provincial Governor Aniceto Clarin handed over the approved resolution to Capitan Canuto Bernales who had to walk all the way to Tagbilaran City to receive it. The approved resolution he receive formally recognized the formation of the town of Mabini. Capitan Canuto Bernales became the first town president of Mabini.

Geography

Barangays

Mabini comprises 22 barangays:

Climate

Demographics

Economy

References

External links

 [ Philippine Standard Geographic Code]
Mabini Online News
Municipality of Mabini
Bohol.ph article on Mabini

Municipalities of Bohol